Father Was a Fullback is a 1949 black-and-white film from 20th Century Fox based on a comedy by Clifford Goldsmith. The film is about a college American football  star and his woes. The film stars Fred MacMurray, Maureen O'Hara, Natalie Wood, and Betty Lynn.

Plot
State College football coach George Cooper has more than enough problems on the job without his teenage daughter Connie complicating his life at home. She has written a story but no one has agreed to publish it yet. Furthermore she is convinced that she is unattractive to the opposite sex and wallows in frustrated self-pity. Resigning herself to a loveless existence, she decides to make literature her life. When she gets a check for $180 for a fictional article she pens about a teenage bubble dancer that recently appeared in a confessions magazine, the boys come calling.

The young author dates a high school football star from across town who chooses to attend State College (rather than Notre Dame University) to be near his newfound sweetheart. She is the first girl he likes more than football. 
George's football and domestic problems seem to be solved.

His wife Elizabeth and housekeeper Geraldine  support the family members in distress, while the younger sister Ellen helps Connie and her father out during this difficult time. In the end she feels much like her sister did in the beginning.

Cast

Principals

 Fred MacMurray as George "Coop" Cooper, a college football coach
 Maureen O'Hara as Elizabeth Cooper, his wife
 Betty Lynn as Constance "Connie" Cooper, his oldest daughter
 Natalie Wood as Ellen Cooper, his youngest daughter
 Thelma Ritter as Geraldine, his housekeeper
 Jim Backus as Professor "Sully" Sullivan, his neighbor (performing under the name, James G. Backus)
 Rudy Vallee as Mr. Roger "Jess" Jessup, a football supporter

Supporting players
 Robert Adler as Grandstand Bit Part (uncredited)
 Don Barclay as Grandstand "Coach" (uncredited)
 Gilbert Barnett as Stinky Parker (uncredited)
 Rodney Bell as Grandstand "Coach" (uncredited)
 Tom Bernard as Delivery Boy (uncredited)
 Harry Carter as Grandstand Bit Part (uncredited)
 Ruth Clifford as Neighbor (uncredited)
 Heinie Conklin as Ed (uncredited)
 Fred Dale as Cheerleader (uncredited)
 Gwenn Fields as Daphne Sullivan (uncredited)
 Bess Flowers as Football Fan (uncredited)
 Charles Flynn as Policeman (uncredited)
 Tom Hanlon as Radio Announcer (uncredited)
 Sam Harris as Alumnus at Dinner (uncredited)
 Joe Haworth as Skip, Reporter in Locker Room (uncredited)
 Don Hicks as Bill (uncredited)
 Pat Kane as Bellhop (uncredited)
 Kenner G. Kemp as Alumnus at Dinner (uncredited)
 Louise Lorimer as Mrs. Jones (uncredited)
 Lee MacGregor as Cheerleader (uncredited)
 Mike Mahoney as Pete, the Sailor (uncredited)
 Buddy Martin as Cheerleader (uncredited)
 Mickey McCardle as Jones (uncredited)
 John McKee as Cy (uncredited)
 Frank Mills as Assistant Football Coach (uncredited)
 Forbes Murray as Mr. Higgins, College President (uncredited)
 Robert Patten as Manager (uncredited)
 Bill Radovich as Football Player (uncredited)
 William Self as Willie Davis (uncredited)
 Richard Tyler as Hercules Smith a.k.a. Joe Birch (uncredited)
 Wilson Wood as Grandstand "Coach" (uncredited)

Behind the scenes
Father Was a Fullback marked the second time child actor Natalie Wood was cast as the daughter of Maureen O'Hara's character. The first was in Miracle on 34th Street. A month after the film was released Wood received the Child of the Year Award in celebration of Children's Day.
Actress Betty Lynn would achieve immortality almost ten years after making Father Was a Fullback as Thelma Lou, Barney Fife's girlfriend in The Andy Griffith Show (1960–1968). Lynn made 26 appearances on the series.

References

External links

1949 films
1949 comedy films
1940s sports comedy films
American black-and-white films
American football films
American sports comedy films
Films directed by John M. Stahl
Films scored by Cyril J. Mockridge
Films set in universities and colleges
20th Century Fox films
1940s English-language films
1940s American films